is a passenger railway station operated by the Takamatsu-Kotohira Electric Railroad in Takamatsu, Kagawa, Japan.  It is operated by the private transportation company Takamatsu-Kotohira Electric Railroad (Kotoden) and is designated station "K04".

Lines
Sanjō Station is a statin on the Kotoden Kotohira Line and is located 3.9 km from the terminus of the line at Takamatsu-Chikkō Station.

Layout
The station consists of two opposed side platforms connected by a level crossing. The platforms support up to 5-car trains and has a roof for 2 cars. The station is unattended.

Adjacent stations

History
Sanjō Station opened on March 1, 1956.

Surrounding area
Youme Town Takamatsu
Kagawa Prefectural Road 280 Takamatsu Kagawa Line
Shikoku Medical Welfare College

Passenger statistics

See also
 List of railway stations in Japan

References

External links

  

Railway stations in Japan opened in 1956
Railway stations in Takamatsu